Len Holmes was an Australian professional rugby league footballer who played for the Canterbury-Bankstown in the 1940s and 1950s. and for the New South Wales Rugby League team in the 1940s.

Playing career
Holmes made his first grade debut for Canterbury-Bankstown in 1945.  In 1947, Holmes played in the club's grand final loss against Balmain.  Holmes played with the club up until the end of 1953 before retiring.

Holmes also represented New South Wales and New South Wales City in 1947 and 1948.

Holmes was the son of former premiership winning player Harold Holmes who played for Eastern Suburbs, South Sydney and Western Suburbs.

References

Australian rugby league players
Canterbury-Bankstown Bulldogs players
Year of birth missing
New South Wales rugby league team players
Place of death missing
1960 deaths
Rugby league second-rows
Rugby league locks